Gerit Pfuhl is a German mountain bike orienteer. At the 2005 World MTB Orienteering Championships in Banska Bystrica she won a gold medal in the relay, together with Anke Dannowski and Antje Bornhak.

At the 2006 World MTB Championships she placed 13th in the middle distance and fifth in the relay.

References

German orienteers
Female orienteers
German female cyclists
Mountain bike orienteers
Living people
Place of birth missing (living people)
Year of birth missing (living people)